John Snow College is one of 17 constituent colleges of the University of Durham in England. The College takes its name from the nineteenth-century Yorkshire physician John Snow.

It was founded in 2001 on the University's Queen's Campus in Stockton-on-Tees, before moving to Durham in 2018. The College is now located on the Mount Oswald site, which opened in 2020.

History

In 1992, the Joint University College on Teesside of the Universities of Durham and Teesside (JUCOT) was established on the site as a joint venture between the University of Durham and the University of Teesside. This was initially intended to grant joint degrees validated by both institutions (BAs and BScs). However, Teesside, which had only become a university in 1992, had difficulties in taking on its responsibilities for the college and Durham took full control in 1994.

A programme of integration with Durham began, leading to the college becoming University College, Stockton (UCS) in 1996 – a college of the University of Durham and the only college with teaching responsibilities. Further integration led to the campus being renamed the University of Durham, Stockton Campus (UDSC) in 1998, and the removal of its teaching responsibilities. In 2001, UDSC was split into two colleges: one was John Snow College, and the other was George Stephenson College; the campus was also renamed University of Durham, Queen's Campus (UDQC), in honour of the Golden Jubilee of Elizabeth II.

In 2018 John Snow College moved temporarily to Howlands Farm, Durham City adjacent to the Josephine Butler and George Stephenson Colleges. For the 2019-20 year, the college moved to Rushford Court in the centre of Durham, a privately operated hall on the site of the former County Hospital.

In 2020, the college moved to its permanent home in new purpose-built buildings at Mount Oswald, between South College and Durham University Business School. The site has seven blocks named after the roads surrounding the Broad Street pump from which John Snow removed the handle during the 1854 Broad Street cholera outbreak: Wardour, Bridle, Carnaby, Marshall, Lexington, Hopkins and Broadwick. Broadwick blocks are built like townhouses, with shared bathrooms, and are located at the back of the college. The rest of the blocks offer en-suite bathrooms and are divided into cluster flats housing 6-8 people. By the main gates of the college, in between Bridle and Wardour, resides a replica of the water pump Snow removed the handle from.

Traditions
John Snow holds termly formal dinners, in which members of college attend in their relevant Academic dress of Durham University. A set of rules governing behaviour at formals is outlined by the college, and disciplined by the JCR Chairman. Two college Balls are held per annum, one in the Michaelmas Term and a further Graduation Ball in the Easter Term, with a large portion of the college in attendance.

The annual Snow Day is a celebration of college life. The event is held within college accommodation and features entertainment, music and food. The day begins with a water fight in the spirit of Snow's medical research into the causes of the Broad Street cholera outbreak, which was ultimately traced to the water supply. A water fight occurred on the first Snow Day on 27 May 2002. The water fight commences early in the morning.

John Snow College is the only college in Durham to have the position of 'College Bugler'. Each year the college bugler processes the new intake of students through the city of Durham and announces their arrival at the Cathedral, ready for Matriculation. The bugler also attends all formal events and announces the high table at the beginning of each formal.

It is tradition for all new members of the college to be matriculated by walking up the main path from the JCR building towards the gates, where they are led by a student dressed as John Snow, then walking under a John Snow banner which formally welcomes them into the college.

John Snow College Boat Club

John Snow College Boat Club (JSBC) is the rowing club of the college.

When Durham University took responsibility of the campus in 1994, Tees Rowing Club was asked to help develop rowing. The campus became known as University College, Stockton (UCS) in 1996 and as such the boat club was called University College Stockton Boat Club (UCSBC), to differentiate it from University College, Durham.

Further integration led to the campus being renamed in 1998 along with the Boat Club University of Durham Stockton Campus Boat Club (UDSCBC) to differentiate it from University College Boat Club. The club rented out rack space for its boats in Tees Rowing Club's boathouse down Boathouse Lane, the site of Tees Rowing Club's boathouse since 1864. The club raced under the Palatinate Colours, the remains of which can be seen on the old blades.

In September 2001, John Snow and George Stephenson Colleges were formed out of University of Durham Stockton Campus but it was decided due to low membership and boats that it should remain a joint club. In November 2001 both Tees Rowing Club and UDSCBC left the site on Boathouse Lane and moved into new shared premises at the River Tees Watersports Centre, which was funded by the Big Lottery Fund and £80,000 from Durham University.

John Snow Rugby Club (JSRFC) 

John Snow Rugby club has been an essential part of the college since its foundation in 2001. The club won the university floodlit cup in 2013 becoming the newest college to achieve this. JSRFC stopped competing in rugby from 2017-2019 for unknown reasons. The team was reformed in the 2019/2020 season where it placed 2nd in the 2nd division, narrowly missing out on promotion. The 2020/21 season was cancelled due to Covid-19. In the 2021/22 season JSRFC placed top of their division earning promotion, as well as reaching the Floodlit Plate finals narrowly losing to SMRFC.

For the purposes of the annual Hill vs Bailey rugby tournament John Snow is a part of the Bailey team. John Snow played an essential part in the 2022 Bailey win over the hill, producing the first success in 12 years.

College officers

The Principal
Carolyn Summerbell is the current Principal of John Snow College and is a Professor of Human Nutrition with research concentrating on Obesity-Related Behaviours.

Former Principals
 H.M. Evans 2002–2008
 Carolyn Summerbell 2008 –

References

External links
 Official website
 John Snow College JCR Undergraduate Student Organisation

Colleges of Durham University
Educational institutions established in 2001
2001 establishments in England
Buildings and structures in the Borough of Stockton-on-Tees
Thornaby-on-Tees
Education in the Borough of Stockton-on-Tees